In molecular biology, mir-160 is a microRNA that has been predicted or experimentally confirmed in a range of plant species including Arabidopsis thaliana (mouse-ear cress) and Oryza sativa (rice). miR-160 is predicted to bind complementary sites in the untranslated regions of auxin response factor genes to regulate their expression. The hairpin precursors (represented here) are predicted based on base pairing and cross-species conservation; their extents are not known.  In this case, the mature sequence is excised from the 5' arm of the hairpin.

Specifically, 3 of A. thaliana's 23 auxin-response factor genes are thought to be  post-transcriptionally regulated by mir-160. When one of these targets (ARF17) is manipulated to become miRNA-resistant, several developmental defects can be observed in the host plant. This experiment has been repeated with another mir-160 target, ARF10, and results highlighted a regulatory role in post-embryonic development and seed germination.

References

External links 
 
 MIPF0000032

MicroRNA
MicroRNA precursor families